Diaugasma olyra is a species of sea snail, a marine gastropod mollusk in the family Raphitomidae.

Description
The length of the shell attains 11 mm. It can be distinguished from Diaugasma epicharta by its much larger size, say 11 mm. long, a wider aperture, a shorter spire, and a pink-tipped apex. It is likewise semi-transparent, and the very delicate spiral striation across the whorls is represented by the Reeve as sometimes evanescent altogether.

Distribution
This marine species occurs off the Philippines and Taiwan.

References

 Reeve, L.A. 1845. Monograph of the genus Pleurotoma. pls 20-33 in Reeve, L.A. (ed). Conchologia Iconica. London : L. Reeve & Co. Vol. 1.

External links
 

olyra
Gastropods described in 1845